N-Morpholinyllysergamide (LSM-775) is a derivative of ergine. It is less potent than LSD but is reported to have some LSD-like effects at doses ranging from 75 to 700 micrograms and a shorter duration. There are fewer signs of cardiovascular stimulation and peripheral toxicity with LSM-775 compared to LSD.

See also 
 1cP-LSD
 1B-LSD
 1P-ETH-LAD
 1P-LSD
 1V-LSD
 ALD-52
 AL-LAD
 ETH-LAD
 Lysergic acid 2,4-dimethylazetidide (LSZ)
 Lysergic acid diethylamide (LSD)
 O-Acetylpsilocin (4-AcO-DMT)
 PRO-LAD

References 

Lysergamides
4-Morpholinyl compunds
Serotonin receptor agonists
Designer drugs